Douglas Willian da Silva Souza (born 27 October 1993), known as Douglas Tanque or simply Douglas, is a Brazilian footballer who plays as a forward for Turkish club Samsunspor.

Club career

Guarani 
Born in Santa Cruz do Rio Pardo, São Paulo, Douglas was a Guarani youth graduate. He made his first team – and Série A – debut on 14 November 2010, starting in a 1–1 home draw against Vitória, and appeared in two further matches as his side was relegated.

Corinthians 
On 4 May 2011, Douglas moved to Corinthians and was assigned to the under-20 squad. On 19 March of the following year, after winning the Copa São Paulo de Futebol Júnior, he moved to Série B side Paraná on loan until the end of the year.

Paraná (loan) 
Douglas scored his first professional goal on 18 April 2012, netting the equalizer in a 1–1 home draw against Ceará, which qualified Paraná to the next round of the year's Copa do Brasil. On 1 May, he scored a hat-trick in a 6–1 home routing of Junior Team.

Ipatinga (loan) and other loans 
On 18 August 2012, after falling down the pecking order, Douglas left Paraná and joined Ipatinga on loan until December. He subsequently served another loan stints at Guaratinguetá, Penapolense and Ponte Preta before his contract with Corinthians expired.

Thespakusatsu Gunma 
In 2015, Douglas moved abroad and joined Japanese J2 League side Thespakusatsu Gunma. In the following year, he switched teams and countries again after agreeing to a contract with Cafetaleros de Tapachula of the Ascenso MX.

Albirex Niigata 
On 22 June 2017, Douglas returned to Japan and joined Albirex Niigata in the J1 League. The following 10 January, the club announced that he would not have his contract renewed, and he subsequently joined Thai League 1 side Police Tero FC on 5 February.

F.C. Paços de Ferreira 
On 5 July 2018, Douglas signed for Portuguese LigaPro side F.C. Paços de Ferreira, scoring nine goals during the campaign as his side achieved promotion as champions.

Khor Fakkan 
On 26 September 2021, Douglas signed a two-year contract with Khor fakkan. Over a month after joining, Douglas hit the net for the first time in a 4-1 win over Al Urooba, after the match he said "I'm so happy to have scored my first for Khor Fakkan and may it be the first of many."

Career statistics

Honours
Corinthians
Copa São Paulo de Futebol Júnior: 2012

Paraná
Campeonato Paranaense Série Prata: 2012

Paços de Ferreira
LigaPro: 2018–19

References

External links
 
  
 
 
 
 

1993 births
Footballers from São Paulo (state)
Living people
Brazilian footballers
Association football forwards
Guarani FC players
Sport Club Corinthians Paulista players
Paraná Clube players
Ipatinga Futebol Clube players
Guaratinguetá Futebol players
Clube Atlético Penapolense players
Associação Atlética Ponte Preta players
Thespakusatsu Gunma players
Cafetaleros de Chiapas footballers
Albirex Niigata players
Douglas Tanque
F.C. Paços de Ferreira players
Khor Fakkan Sports Club players
Samsunspor footballers
Campeonato Brasileiro Série A players
Campeonato Brasileiro Série B players
J2 League players
Ascenso MX players
J1 League players
Douglas Tanque
Liga Portugal 2 players
Primeira Liga players
UAE Pro League players
TFF First League players
Brazilian expatriate footballers
Expatriate footballers in Japan
Brazilian expatriate sportspeople in Japan
Expatriate footballers in Mexico
Brazilian expatriate sportspeople in Mexico
Expatriate footballers in Thailand
Brazilian expatriate sportspeople in Thailand
Expatriate footballers in Portugal
Brazilian expatriate sportspeople in Portugal
Expatriate footballers in the United Arab Emirates
Brazilian expatriate sportspeople in the United Arab Emirates
Expatriate footballers in Turkey
Brazilian expatriate sportspeople in Turkey